The Swan River Trust was a Western Australian state government statutory authority defined by the Swan and Canning Rivers Management Act 2006. The Trust reported to the Minister for Environment.

It was preceded by the Swan River Management Authority (1977–1989) and earlier Swan River Conservation Board (1959–1976).
It was established in 1989 to protect and manage the Swan and Canning rivers.

The Trust had several community engagement programs that allowed the Perth community to be involved in caring for the Swan Canning Riverpark including River Guardians, the Dolphin Watch Project, and Ribbons of Blue.

On 1 July 2015, the staff and functions of the Swan River Trust were merged with the Department of Parks and Wildlife.

See also
 Department of Conservation and Land Management
 Department of Environment and Conservation (Western Australia)

References

External links
 Swan River Trust corporate website
 Swan River Trust Facebook Fan Page
 Follow Swan River Trust on Twitter
 Department of Parks and Wildlife

Nature conservation in Western Australia
Government agencies of Western Australia
Science and technology in Western Australia
Water resources management
Swan River (Western Australia)
Canning River (Western Australia)